Seatonville may refer to:

Seatonville, Illinois
Seatonville, Louisville, Kentucky